Min Ji-hyun (born November 6, 1984) is a South Korean actress.

Filmography

Television series

Film

Music video

Awards and nominations

References

External links
  
 
 
 
 

1984 births
Living people
South Korean television actresses
South Korean film actresses